Vojislav Stanković (Serbian Cyrillic: Војислав Станковић; born 22 September 1987) is a Serbian professional footballer who plays for Azerbaijani club Neftçi Baku. He can operate as either a left or central defender.

Club career

Early years
Stanković made his senior debut with his hometown club Dinamo Vranje, before moving to OFK Beograd in the 2009 winter transfer window. He quickly became an important part of the team under manager Dejan Đurđević.

Partizan
In the 2010 winter transfer window, Stanković was transferred to Partizan, signing a five-year deal. He made his competitive debut for the club in a league fixture versus Čukarički on 20 March 2010, coming in as a substitute for Mladen Krstajić in the second half of the match that Partizan won 3–0. Until the end of the 2009–10 season, Stanković made 10 league appearances, as the club won its third consecutive championship title.

On 24 August 2010, Stanković scored the winning goal in the penalty shoot-out against Anderlecht in Brussels, as the club advanced to the group stage of the UEFA Champions League for the first time after seven years. However, Stanković failed to become a first team regular, making only 19 league appearances in three seasons (2010–2013).

Stanković finally became a first team regular in the 2013–14 season, making 25 league appearances and scoring once. He scored his first official goal for Partizan in a 3–2 home win over Donji Srem on 9 November 2013.

Azerbaijan
In February 2015, Stanković signed a two-year contract with Azerbaijani club Inter Baku. In June 2015, Stanković moved to fellow Azerbaijani club Gabala on an 18-month loan deal. On 16 December 2017, Stanković signed a new contract with Gabala until the end of 2019.

On 4 June 2019, Stanković signed a two-year contract with Neftçi Baku. On 16 June 2021, Stanković signed a new one-year contract, with the option of an additional year, with Neftçi.

International career
Stanković made one appearance for the Serbia national team in a friendly match against Japan on 7 April 2010 in Osaka.

Statistics

Club

International

Statistics accurate as of match played 7 April 2010

Honours
Partizan
 Serbian SuperLiga: 2009–10, 2010–11, 2011–12, 2012–13
 Serbian Cup: 2010–11

Gabala
 Azerbaijan Cup: 2018–19

Neftçi
 Azerbaijan Premier League: 2020–21

References

External links
 
 
 
 

Serbian footballers
Association football defenders
Azerbaijan Premier League players
Expatriate footballers in Azerbaijan
Shamakhi FK players
FK Dinamo Vranje players
FK Partizan players
Gabala FC players
OFK Beograd players
People from Vranje
Serbia international footballers
Serbian expatriate footballers
Serbian expatriate sportspeople in Azerbaijan
Serbian First League players
Serbian SuperLiga players
1987 births
Living people